James Wallace (fl. 1684–1724) was a Scottish physician and botanist.

Life
He was the eldest son of James Wallace, a minister in Orkney. He qualified M.D., and took part in the Darien scheme.  He passed some plants from what is now Panama to James Petiver, and Hans Sloane. He became Fellow of the Royal Society, and had some employment with the East India Company. His later life is obscure.

Works
He edited his father's Description of the Isles of Orkney in 1693 and 1700. The first edition was dedicated to Robert Sibbald; the second, which added information on plants and shells of Orkney, was dedicated to Charles Sackville, 6th Earl of Dorset and made no mention of his father's contribution. In 1700 he contributed to the Philosophical Transactions of the Royal Society ‘A Part of a Journal kept from Scotland to New Caledonia in Darien, with a short Account of that Country’.

Wallace was also the author of a ‘History of Scotland from Fergus I to the Commencement of the Union,’ Dublin, 1724.

References

Attribution

Scottish botanists
Scottish naturalists
Plant collectors
Year of birth missing
17th-century births
1724 deaths
Fellows of the Royal Society
British East India Company civil servants
Historians of Scotland
Scottish editors
18th-century Scottish historians
Scottish travel writers
Writers from Orkney
History of Orkney
18th-century British botanists
17th-century Scottish medical doctors
18th-century Scottish medical doctors
17th-century Scottish writers
18th-century Scottish writers